Carlos Mina (born February 1, 1971 in Bogotá, Colombia) is a former Colombian naturalized Chilean footballer who played for clubs of Colombia and Chile.

Teams
  Deportivo Cali 1990-1991
  Huachipato 1992-1993
  Deportivo Cali 1994
  Huachipato 1994-1995
  Deportes Linares 1996-1997
  San Marcos de Arica 1998
  Deportes Linares 1999-2001
  Deportes Antofagasta 2002-2003
  Provincial Osorno 2004-2005
  Deportes Temuco 2006-2007

References
 Profile at BDFA 

1971 births
Living people
Colombian footballers
Colombian expatriate footballers
Deportivo Cali footballers
C.D. Huachipato footballers
San Marcos de Arica footballers
Deportes Temuco footballers
C.D. Antofagasta footballers
Deportes Linares footballers
Provincial Osorno footballers
Chilean Primera División players
Primera B de Chile players
Expatriate footballers in Chile
Colombian expatriate sportspeople in Chile
Association footballers not categorized by position
Footballers from Bogotá
Naturalized citizens of Chile